Emma Thayer may refer to:
 Emma Homan Thayer, American botanical artist and author of books about native wildflowers
 Emma Beach Thayer, American artist
 Emma Redington Thayer, pseudonym Lee Thayer, American artist and author of mystery novels